Dr. Daniela Cristina Zappi (1965-) is a Brazilian botanist, plant collector, and research scientist at the herbarium of the Royal Botanic Gardens, Kew noted for studying and describing Neotropical flora, Rubiaceae, and Cactaceae.  She has described over 90 species.

References 

1965 births
Brazilian women scientists
21st-century Brazilian botanists
Living people
20th-century Brazilian botanists
Botanists active in Kew Gardens